Patricia Ann Hird (born 11 November 1934) is a British former tennis player.

Active in the 1950s and 1960s, Hird twice reached the singles fourth round at Wimbledon and was a two-time women's doubles quarter-finalist. In 1954 she was a member of Great Britain's Wightman Cup team, featuring in a doubles rubber with Angela Buxton. She left tennis in the mid-1960s to become a hostess on an ocean liner.

References

1934 births
Living people
British female tennis players